The freestream is the air far upstream of an aerodynamic body, that is, before the body has a chance to deflect, slow down or compress the air. Freestream conditions are usually denoted with a  symbol, e.g. , meaning the freestream velocity.

References
Anderson, John D., 1989. Introduction to Flight, 3rd Ed. McGraw-Hill

Aerodynamics